Cascarino is a surname. Notable people with the surname include:

 Delphine Cascarino (born 1997), French women's footballer
 Estelle Cascarino (born 1997), French women's footballer
 Romeo Cascarino (1922–2002), American classical composer
 Tony Cascarino (born 1962), Irish footballer

Surnames of Italian origin